The Geldersch-Westfaalsche Stoomtram-Maatschappij was a  gauge steam tram that operated over two routes, firstly between Lichtenvoorde, Aalten, Heurne and Bocholt, a total of , and secondly between Lichtenvoorde, Terborg and Zeddam, a total of . The tramway operated between 1908 and about 1953, however in 1920 the company was merged into the Geldersche Stoomtramweg Maatschappij.

See also 
 Narrow-gauge railways in the Netherlands

References 

Steam trams in the Netherlands
750 mm gauge railways in the Netherlands

de:Bahnstrecke Lichtenvoorde–Bocholt